Bachmann is a surname of Switzerland and Germany.

Bachmann may also refer to:

 Bachmann (Staten Island Railway station)
 "Bachmann" (short story), a short story by Vladimir Nabokov
 Bachmann Industries, a model railroading company
 Bachmann's Brewery, Staten Island, New York
 Bachmann knot, a type of friction hitch, which is a kind of knot used to attach one rope to another in a way that is easily adjusted